The Battle of Arques was fought on 4 April 1303 in the French city of Arques between the County of Flanders and the Kingdom of France.

Background
The Battle of the Golden Spurs was an embarrassing defeat for King Philip IV of France that liberated the whole of the County from French occupation. Eager for revenge, King Philip raised a new army under Gaucher de Châtillon, Constable of France, and moved against Flanders. The Flemish under William of Jülich were checking the French troops and both armies met on August 30, 1302, between Arras and Douai. Negotiations were opened and both armies withdrew a few days later without fighting.

Battle
In the spring of 1303 the French army moved against Saint-Omer. William of Jülich responded by an attack on the weakly defended city of Arques, killing the French garrison of 60 and burning down the city. De Châtillon hurried to Arques, where the Flemish prepared for battle. As in the Battle of the Golden Spurs, William of Jülich positioned his infantry, mainly from Ypres in a horseshoe shaped formation. For hours, the French tried to break the Flemish formation, but to no avail. Finally the French withdrew to Saint-Omer, leaving 300 dead behind. The Flemish had lost 1,000 killed and did not pursue. The battle was a Flemish victory, as they retained the field. A new French invasion of Flanders had been prevented.

Aftermath
This battle was followed by a Flemish defeat the next year in the north in the Battle of Zierikzee, where the French were supported by the Count of Holland.

Casualties
The Franciscan Friar of Ghent reported 1,000 Flemish killed, mostly non-combatants. The French Chronicler Guillaume Guiart put the French death toll at 300. These estimates are accepted by Verbruggen. The Flemish death toll varies in the French chronicles. The Chronique Normande gave 2,000 dead, Jean Desnouelles and the Récits d'un bourgeois de Valenciennes 12,000, Guillaume de Franchet 15,000, the Chronique Artésienne 16,000 and the Chronique des Pays-Bas 24,000.

Citations

Bibliography

 
 

1303 in Europe
1300s in France
Conflicts in 1303
Battles involving Flanders
Battles involving France
Battles of the Middle Ages
Battles in Hauts-de-France
Military history of the Pas-de-Calais
Franco-Flemish War
14th century in the county of Flanders